Goniini is a tribe of parasitic flies in the family Tachinidae.  Members of Goniini are distinguished from other Tachinidae by laying small "microtype" eggs that hatch only after being ingested by a host.

Genera
Allophorocera Hendel, 1901
Aneogmena Brauer & von Bergenstamm, 1891
Arama Richter, 1972
Argyrophylax Brauer & von Bergenstamm, 1889
Asseclamyia Reinhard, 1956
Atacta Schiner, 1868
Atactopsis Townsend, 1917
Atractocerops Townsend, 1916
Baumhaueria Meigen, 1838
Belvosia Robineau-Desvoidy, 1830
Blepharella Macquart, 1851
Blepharipa Rondani, 1856
Bothria Rondani, 1856
Brachicheta Rondani, 1861
Cadurcia Villeneuve, 1926
Calozenillia Townsend, 1927
Carceliella Baranov, 1934
Ceratochaetops Mesnil, 1954
Ceromasia Rondani, 1856
Chaetocrania Townsend, 1915
Chaetogaedia Brauer & von Bergenstamm, 1891
Chaetoglossa Townsend, 1892
Chrysoexorista Townsend, 1915
Clemelis Robineau-Desvoidy, 1863
Crosskeya Shima & Chao, 1988
Cyzenis Robineau-Desvoidy, 1863
Distichona Wulp, 1890
Dolichocolon Brauer & von Bergenstamm, 1889
Eleodiphaga Walton, 1918
Elodia Robineau-Desvoidy, 1863
Erycilla Mesnil, 1957
Erynnia Robineau-Desvoidy, 1830
Erythrocera Robineau-Desvoidy, 1849
Euceromasia Townsend, 1912
Eucnephalia Townsend, 1892
Euexorista Townsend, 1912
Eumea Robineau-Desvoidy, 1863
Eumeella Mesnil, 1939
Eurysthaea Robineau-Desvoidy, 1863
Frontina Meigen, 1838
Frontiniella Townsend, 1918
Gaediopsis Brauer & von Bergenstamm, 1891
Gonia Meigen, 1803
Goniophthalmus Villeneuve, 1910
Hebia Robineau-Desvoidy, 1830
Hesperomyia Brauer & von Bergenstamm, 1889
Houghia Coquillett, 1897
Hypertrophomma Townsend, 1915
Hyphantrophaga Townsend, 1892
Isochaetina Mesnil, 1950
Kuwanimyia Townsend, 1916
Leschenaultia Robineau-Desvoidy, 1830
Masistylum Brauer & von Bergenstamm, 1893
Mystacella Wulp, 1890
Myxexoristops Townsend, 1911
Nealsomyia Mesnil, 1939
Ocytata Gistel, 1848
Onychogonia Brauer & von Bergenstamm, 1889
Oraphasmophaga Reinhard, 1958
Otomasicera Townsend, 1912
Pales Meigen, 1800
Palesisa Villeneuve, 1929
Paraphasmophaga Townsend, 1915
Paravibrissina Shima, 1979
Patelloa Townsend, 1916
Pexopsis Brauer & von Bergenstamm, 1889
Phryno Robineau-Desvoidy, 1830
Platymya Robineau-Desvoidy, 1830
Polygasropteryx Mesnil, 1953
Prosopea Rondani, 1861
Prosopodopsis Townsend, 1926
Prospherysa Wulp, 1890
Pseudalsomyia Mesnil, 1968
Pseudochaeta Coquillett, 1895
Pseudogonia Brauer & von Bergenstamm, 1889
Pujolina Mesnil, 1968
Scaphimyia Mesnil, 1955
Simoma Aldrich, 1926
Spallanzania Robineau-Desvoidy, 1830
Sturmia Robineau-Desvoidy, 1830
Suensonomyia Mesnil, 1953
Takanomyia Mesnil, 1957
Thelairodrino Mesnil, 1954
Thelymorpha Brauer & Bergenstamm, 1889
Torosomyia Reinhard, 1935
Tritaxys Macquart, 1847
Trixomorpha Brauer & von Bergenstamm, 1889
Zenillia Robineau-Desvoidy, 1830

References

Diptera of Europe
Diptera of Asia
Diptera of North America
Exoristinae